Virtex (FPGA), a series of FPGAs produced by Xilinx
 Virtex, a series of comic books published by Oktomica Comics
 Virtex L, otherwise known as sodium dithionite

See also 
 Vertex (disambiguation)